José Antonio Meléndez Rodríguez (born January 9, 1962) is a Nicaraguan-American guitar player, composer, singer, and songwriter who was born without arms. His mother took thalidomide while pregnant, which caused his disability. Meléndez has learned to play the guitar with his feet.

Career
Meléndez began playing and singing in the Los Angeles area in 1985. On September 15, 1987, Meléndez sang Never Be the Same while playing the guitar with his feet in a special performance for Pope John Paul II. Visibly moved, the Pope descended from his chair and embraced Meléndez. The Pope told Meléndez, "My wish to you, is to continue of giving [sic] this hope to all, all the people," which inspired him.

His band, Tony Meléndez and the Toe Jam Band, has a busy concert schedule. Meléndez gives motivational talks and has written a book. He campaigns actively for the anti-abortion cause.

Meléndez now resides in Branson, Missouri with his wife, Lynn.

Awards and recognition
Meléndez has won Unity Awards Male Vocalist of the Year UCMVA in 2000, 2002, and 2004, and.  In 2002, he took Artist of the year. He received the Branson Entertainment Award for Best New Artist in 1999, the "Inspirational Hero Award from the NFL Alumni Association at the Super Bowl XXIII and has received special commendations from the State of California for his work with young people and from President Reagan, regarding Tony "as a positive role model for America".

Meléndez spoke candidly about the effect disability had on his life and work in the book Chronicles of Courage: Very Special Artists written by Jean Kennedy Smith and George Plimpton and published by Random House.

Special Commendation from President Reagan — As A Positive Role Model for America
Special Commendation from State of California - For Work with Young People
Inspirational Hero Award from the NFL Alumni Association at Super Bowl XXIII in Miami
Branson Entertainment Awards – Best New Artist (1999)
Unity Awards — Male Vocalist of the Year UCMVA (2000)
Unity Awards — Artist of the Year UCMVA (2002)
Unity Awards — Male Vocalist of the Year UCMVA (2002)
Unity Awards — Male Vocalist of the Year UCMVA (2004)

Discography 

 Never be the Same (1988)
 Ways of the Wise (1990)
 El Muro Se Callo (1991)
 Debe Haber (1995)
 Hands in Heaven (1997)
 The Cup of Life (1998)
 Intimate Worship (1999)

Published works
A Gift of Hope (1991)

Sources

See also
 Mark Goffeney
 Marty Ravellette

External links
 

Nicaraguan composers
Male composers
Nicaraguan emigrants to the United States
Nicaraguan male writers
Nicaraguan Roman Catholics
American male singers
American male non-fiction writers
American autobiographers
American male composers
20th-century American composers
Songwriters from California
American performers of Christian music
People without hands
1962 births
Living people
20th-century Nicaraguan male singers
Guitarists from Los Angeles
20th-century American guitarists
American male guitarists
20th-century American male musicians
American male songwriters